Megan Gallagher (born May 12, 1963) is an American handball player. She competed in the women's tournament at the 1988 Summer Olympics.

References

External links
 

1963 births
Living people
American female handball players
Olympic handball players of the United States
Handball players at the 1988 Summer Olympics
People from Fontana, California
Medalists at the 1987 Pan American Games
Pan American Games gold medalists for the United States
Pan American Games medalists in handball